The 2016 Melbourne Football Club season was the club's 117th year in the VFL/AFL since it began in 1897. In Paul Roos' final season as senior coach before succession coach, Simon Goodwin took over, the club won ten matches out of twenty-two to finish eleventh on the ladder out of eighteen teams and finished on 97.6 percent. It was the club's best season on the field since the 2011 season in which the club finished with eight wins, thirteen losses and a draw, to finish with a percentage of 85.3.

Senior personnel
Nathan Jones was retained as captain for the third consecutive season. The leadership group was overhauled where none of the leaders, aside from Jones, were retained in the group from 2015 and the club elected to have no vice-captain. The leadership group included Colin Garland, Max Gawn, Nathan Jones, Tom McDonald, Bernie Vince, and Jack Viney.

Due to Paul Roos entering his final year as senior coach, there was a reshuffle in coaching, whereby Roos' role shifted towards a focus on culture, so the transition to coach-in-waiting, Simon Goodwin, was as smooth as possible for 2017. In addition there was increased responsibility for development and strategy coach, Brendan McCartney, as the club increased its focus on development. Michelle Cowan continued in her role as the coach of Melbourne's women's team and in February, she became the first female assistant coach in Melbourne's history and the second in AFL history serving as the player development and welfare coach. Due to family reasons she left the club in July and returned to Western Australia to work with the Fremantle Football Club. Glen Bartlett continued in his role as club president, a role he has held since August 2013. Chief Executive Officer, Peter Jackson, continued with the club after signing a contract extension to the end of the 2017 season.

Fixture summary
A fixture that was described by Chief Executive Officer, Peter Jackson, as "pleasing", Melbourne played four out of their first five matches at the Melbourne Cricket Ground, with twelve in total at the MCG. Melbourne featured in the only Sunday-night match of the AFL season when they hosted  in the ANZAC Day eve match at the MCG. They again hosted  in the annual Queen's Birthday clash in round 12 at the MCG, and due to an ongoing sponsorship deal with Tourism NT, they again played two home matches in the Northern Territory, the first against  at TIO Traeger Park in round 10 and the second against  at TIO Stadium in round 16. Melbourne played for premiership points in Tasmania for the first time when they played  in round 3 at Blundstone Arena, they also played a match in Queensland for the first time since round 20, 2013 when they played  at Metricon Stadium in round seven, meaning they played in every state and territory in Australia excluding the Australian Capital Territory.

Due to finishing in the bottom six in 2015, Melbourne did not play in many prime-time matches with no Thursday and Friday night matches and they played in only two Saturday night matches, both outside of Victoria. Based on analysis by AFL Media and The Age, Melbourne's draw difficulty was consistent with their bottom six finish in 2015, however, analysis by the Herald Sun estimated they had the fourth most difficult fixture in the league.

2016 list changes

2015 trades

Retirements and delistings

National draft

Rookie draft

2016 squad

2016 season

Pre-season

The 2016 NAB Challenge saw the senior assistant coach, Simon Goodwin take over as coach in preparation for him becoming the senior coach of the club from the 2017 season. Melbourne was one of three teams to finish undefeated during the pre-season competition with a nineteen-point win against , a twelve-point win against  and a twenty five point win against . The list headed into the main season with very little injuries apart from young midfielder, Angus Brayshaw who suffered a knee injury five seconds into the first match of the NAB Challenge, which forced him to miss the remainder of the pre-season and round one against .

Week 1

Week 2

Week 3

Home and away season
The opening round saw Melbourne defeat  by two points at the Melbourne Cricket Ground (MCG) in a come from behind victory in which Melbourne scored six final quarter goals to two. Clayton Oliver made his AFL debut in the match, with Tomas Bugg and Ben Kennedy playing their first match for Melbourne after being traded from Greater Western Sydney and  respectively. The club entered the round two match against  as heavy favourites; Melbourne ultimately lost the match by thirteen points, with Jack Viney admitting after the match they "lacked respect" for Essendon due to the numerous top-up signings from the supplements saga and the players "got ahead of themselves". Josh Wagner and Jayden Hunt made their AFL debuts in rounds three and four respectively. Melbourne played their first match at Etihad Stadium for the season in a home match against , even though St Kilda are a tenant of Etihad Stadium. Melbourne lost the match by thirty-nine points, however the match saw the highly hyped Christian Petracca make his long-awaited AFL debut and Jesse Hogan kicked a career-high seven goals.

The match against Gold Coast saw Melbourne score 161 points, their highest since round six in 2004. The club headed to Alice Springs in round ten for their first sold home match of the year as part of a sponsorship with Tourism NT. Jack Trengove made his long-awaited return in round eleven against , playing his first AFL match since round two in 2014. The match was level at three-quarter time, however three final quarter goals to zero saw Hawthorn win by eighteen points. The next week was the annual Queen's Birthday clash against Collingwood which Melbourne won by forty-six points, their first Queen's Birthday win since 2007. Melbourne's score of 31  was the lowest score ever recorded at the Sydney Cricket Ground.

Melbourne's first match after the bye was against the in form,  at the MCG, losing by twenty-two points; the match was described as a much closer match than what the scoreboard suggested. Melbourne returned to the Northern Territory for the second time during the season, this time in a thirty-two point win against  in Darwin; it was also Melbourne's first win in the Northern Territory since 2011. In round 17, Melbourne returned to Etihad Stadium to play against St Kilda for the second time in the season, it was another disappointing loss and the fourteenth consecutive loss against St Kilda. The chance of playing finals was effectively ruled out by then-coach Paul Roos. Three consecutive wins against Gold Coast, Hawthorn and Port Adelaide meant Melbourne were back in the frame to potentially play finals. The match against Hawthorn, labelled as one of the upsets of the season, drew high media attention as Hawthorn were on a nine-match winning streak, were on top of the ladder and Melbourne hadn't defeated Hawthorn since 2006. The win against Port Adelaide was also Melbourne's first victory against Port Adelaide in South Australia since 2000. Despite having a chance to play finals, Melbourne lost to an out of form  who had lost their previous nine matches, Melbourne's performance was described as "dispirited". The final match of the season saw Melbourne play at Simonds Stadium against , they suffered a 111-point loss, the worst for the season and outgoing coach, Paul Roos' biggest defeat in his coaching career.

Round 1

Round 2

Round 3

Round 4

Round 5

Round 6

Round 7

Round 8

Round 9

Round 10

Round 11

Round 12

Round 13

Round 14

Round 15

Round 16

Round 17

Round 18

Round 19

Round 20

Round 21

Round 22

Round 23

Ladder

Ladder breakdown by opposition

Tribunal and match review panel cases

Awards

Brownlow Medal tally

Keith 'Bluey' Truscott Medal tally (top 10)

Keith 'Bluey' Truscott Trophy – Jack Viney

Sid Anderson Memorial Trophy (second in the best and fairest) – Nathan Jones

Ron Barassi Snr Memorial Trophy (third in the best and fairest) – Max Gawn

Ivor Warne-Smith Memorial Trophy (fourth in the best and fairest) – Dom Tyson

Dick Taylor Memorial Trophy (fifth in the best and fairest) – Jack Watts

Harold Ball Memorial Trophy (best young player) – Jayden Hunt

Troy Broadbridge Trophy (best Melbourne-listed player in the VFL) – Jack Grimes

Ron Barassi Jnr Trophy (leadership award) – Jack Viney

Ian Ridley Trophy (club ambassador award) – Neville Jetta

Norm Smith Memorial Trophy (coach's award) – Max Gawn

James McDonald Trophy (heart and spirit award) – Max Gawn

Leading goalkicker award – Jesse Hogan (41 goals)

References

External links
 Official Website of the Melbourne Football Club
 Official Website of the AFL

2016
Melbourne Football Club